Andre Maleek Chachere (born February 10, 1996) is an American football cornerback for the Philadelphia Eagles of the National Football League (NFL). He played college football at San Jose State.

Early life and college career
Born and raised in Fresno, California, Chachere graduated from Clovis West High School. His father Derrick Chachere played seven seasons in the Arena Football League from 1995 to 2002.

At San Jose State University, Chachere played at cornerback for the San Jose State Spartans from 2014 to 2017. After playing primarily on special teams in his first season, Chachere was a starter for his last three seasons. In 49 career games, Chachere had 122 total tackles, 4.5 tackles for loss for 14 yards (including a sack), three forced fumbles, seven interceptions for 169 yards, and 27 passes defended. In San Jose State's 27-16 victory over Georgia State in the 2015 Cure Bowl, Chachere made an interception in the end zone in the final minute. Chachere graduated from San Jose State in May 2018 with a bachelor's degree in communication studies.

Professional career

Houston Texans
Chachere signed with the Houston Texans as an undrafted free agent on May 11, 2018. He was waived on September 1, 2018 and was signed to the practice squad the next day.

Detroit Lions
On November 21, 2018, Chachere was signed to the Detroit Lions practice squad. He was promoted to the active roster on December 29, 2018. He was waived during final roster cuts on August 30, 2019.

Arizona Cardinals
On September 11, 2019, Chachere was signed to the Arizona Cardinals practice squad. He was released on October 11.

Carolina Panthers
Chachere was signed to the Carolina Panthers' practice squad on October 21, 2019.

Arizona Cardinals (second stint)
On December 18, 2019, Chachere was signed by the Arizona Cardinals off the Panthers practice squad. Chachere was released on May 12, 2020.

Indianapolis Colts 
Chachere had a tryout with the Indianapolis Colts on August 13, 2020, and with the Tennessee Titans on August 17. He visited the Colts again on August 20, and signed with them on August 23, 2020. He was waived on September 5, 2020 and signed to the practice squad the next day. On January 10, 2021, Chachere signed a reserve/futures contract with the Colts.

On September 1, 2021, Chachere was waived by the Colts.

Philadelphia Eagles 
On September 2, 2021, Chachere was claimed off waivers by the Philadelphia Eagles. During his first three games with the Eagles, Chachere primarily played a role as a gunner on special teams, but he has also served as the backup nickelback and safety. He was placed into COVID protocols on December 27 but was activated on January 3, 2022, missing just one game.

On March 15, 2022, Chachere re-signed with the Eagles.  On August 30, 2022, Chachere was waived by the Eagles and signed to the practice squad the next day. He was promoted to the active roster on November 8. He was waived on December 6, and re-signed to the practice squad.

References

External links
San Jose State Spartans bio

1996 births
Living people
American football cornerbacks
Arizona Cardinals players
Carolina Panthers players
Detroit Lions players
Houston Texans players
Indianapolis Colts players
Philadelphia Eagles players
Players of American football from California
San Jose State Spartans football players
Sportspeople from Fresno, California